Rocklands is a civil parish in the English county of Norfolk which encompasses the villages of Rockland All Saints and Rockland St Peter.
For the purposes of local government, it falls within the district of Breckland.

History 
The parish was formed on 1 April 1935 from Rockland All Saints and St Andrew and Rockland St Peter.

Notes 

Civil parishes in Norfolk
Breckland District